Everton may refer to:

Places

Australia 
Everton, Victoria
Electoral district of Everton, Queensland

Canada 
Everton, Ontario

South Africa 
Everton, part of Kloof, KwaZulu-Natal

United Kingdom 
Everton, Bedfordshire, England
Everton, Hampshire, England
Everton, Liverpool, a district of Liverpool, England
Everton (ward), a Liverpool City Council Ward
Everton, Nottinghamshire, England

United States 
Everton, Arkansas
Everton, Indiana
Everton, Missouri

Sport
Everton F.C., an English football club based in Liverpool, England
Everton L.F.C., a team playing in the Women's Premier League
Everton Tigers, former name of Mersey Tigers, a basketball franchise formerly owned by the football club
Everton de Viña del Mar, a Chilean football team named after the original British football team
Everton F.C. (Trinidad and Tobago), a former Trinidad and Tobago football team

People

Given name
Éverton Barbosa da Hora (born 1983), Brazilian footballer
Everton Blender (born 1954), Jamaican reggae singer and producer
Éverton Cardoso da Silva (born 1988), Brazilian footballer
Everton Guimarães Ferreira (born 1986), Brazilian footballer
Everton Fox (born 1964), British weather presenter
Everton Luiz (born 1988), Brazilian footballer
Everton Ramos da Silva (born 1983),  Brazilian footballer
Éverton Ribeiro (born 1989), Brazilian footballer
Everton Silva (born 1988), Brazilian footballer
Everton Soares (born 1996), Brazilian footballer
Everton Weekes (born 1925), West Indian cricketer

Surname
Clive Everton (born 1937), Welsh snooker commentator, journalist and author
John Scott Everton (1908–2003), American college president and diplomat
Loren D. Everton (1915–1991), American Marine officer, flying ace and Navy Cross recipient

See also

Ewerton (disambiguation)
Ewerthon (born 1981), Brazilian footballer